The Joint Maritime Training Center (JMTC), also known as the Special Missions Training Center (SMTC), is a joint United States Coast Guard, Navy, and Marine Corps training facility located on Camp Lejeune, North Carolina. JMTC's mission is to provide relevant and credible Maritime Security Training and Operational Testing and Evaluation in support of Department of Defense and Department of Homeland Security missions. JMTC comprises four main divisions: Weapons, Port Security, Engineering / Logistics, and Fast Boat.

History
The origins of the Joint Maritime Training Center lie in the Coast Guard Port Security Unit Training Detachment (PSU TRADET). Originally located in Port Clinton, Ohio, the PSU TRADET was tasked with improving the mission effectiveness, unit readiness, and providing pre-deployment support for the Coast Guard's Port Security Units (PSUs).

In November 1998 PSU TRADET relocated to Marine Corps Base Camp Lejeune, North Carolina and by the summer of 2001 its mission had expanded to include non-lethal weapons and the Fast Boat Center of Excellence, as well as conducting training for cutter small boats over-the-horizon tactics designed to enhance interdiction abilities in counter narcotics operations.
After the terrorist attacks of 11 September 2001, the PSU TRADET began training the newly created Coast Guard Maritime Safety and Security Teams (MSSTs).

The unit grew and evolved to accommodate the broadened responsibilities and growing inter-agency and international training requests. In August 2002, the name of the command changed to Coast Guard Special Missions Training Center (SMTC) to better incorporate its multi-faceted capabilities. SMTC was commissioned as a Headquarters unit on 29 July 2003.

In 2003, the U.S. Navy established a training detachment within SMTC to train Mobile Security Force (MSF) personnel as Tactical Coxswains and Crewmen, and in 2004 added crew served weapons training. The Marine Corps also established a small boat training detachment (SBTD) to support USMC operational requirements. In 2006, the NAVDET and MARDET commenced a two-year training surge for the Navy's new Naval Expeditionary Combat Command (NECC) Riverine Force.

In 2008, SMTC completed the move to four new buildings within Courthouse Bay, and the unit was renamed for the second time as the Joint Maritime Training Center (JMTC) to more accurately reflect the unit's diverse range of multi-service military personnel and training center.

Currently, all Coast Guardsmen who have been selected to serve in the Kingdom of Bahrain in support of Patrol Forces Southwest Asia and Operation Inherent Resolve attend pre-deployment training at Special Missions Training Center.

Training

Coast Guard courses

 Non-Compliant Vessel Pursuit Course (NCVP)
 Port Security Unit Basic Skills Course
 Tactical Coxswain Course (TCC)
 Tactical Boat Crew Member Course (TBCM)
 Crew Served Weapon, Mk 19, 40mm Machine Gun Course
 Basic Tactical Operations Course (BTOC)
 Advanced Marksmanship Instructor Course (AMI)

Navy courses

 Riverine Combat Skills Course (RCS)
 Riverine Crewman Course (RCC)
 Riverine Unit Level Leaders Course (RULL)
 Riverine Security Team Trainer (RSTT)

Marine Corps courses

 Small Craft Mechanics Course (SCMC)
 Combat Rubber Reconnaissance Craft Repair Course (CRRC-RC)

Divisions

Weapons Division
The Weapons Division is responsible for providing less-lethal weapons testing for the US Coast Guard. The Weapons Division identifies, tests, evaluates and develops tactics, techniques and procedures for maritime delivered weapons technologies. Additionally, the Weapons Division provides weapons training and support to both Fast Boat and Port Security Divisions. Training includes various service small arms, such as the M240B, M2 Browning machine gun and the Mk 19 grenade launcher crew-served weapons system. JMTC also operates Fire Arms Training Simulator IV (FATS), which supports crew served weapons training and tactics development.

Port Security Division 
The Port Security Division provides Port Security Unit (PSU) and Maritime Safety and Security Team (MSST) training in counter-terrorism and force protection tactics, techniques, and procedures. Courses include chemical, biological, and radiological defense, basic skills courses, pier and vehicle searches, and military operations in urban terrain (MOUT). The Port Security Division also maintains a group of cultural guides and charts, maps, imagery and publications of strategic ports worldwide.

Engineering/Logistics Division
The Logistics Department, part of the Engineering and Logistics Division, provides the support, supplies and maintenance for all activities at JMTC. Procurement and contracting are done through various sources including those used by Marine Corps Base Camp Lejeune as well as UNICOR, General Services Administration and commercial vendors. The Engineering Division handles all of the aspects of the vehicle and boat maintenance from routine preventative maintenance to ordering parts for vehicles used during training.

Fast Boat Division
The Fast Boat Division provides standardized, safe and relevant fast boat tactics and training to students. Inherent in this mission is the requirement for knowledgeable instructors, who maintain proficiency in the most up-to-date fast boat tactics, techniques and procedures for all US Coast Guard, US Navy, and US Marine Corps small boats. Within the Fast Boat Division, there are two sections: the Tactical Coxswain section, which instructs Navy Mobile Security Forces (NMSF), Maritime Safety and Security Teams (MSST), and Port Security Unit (PSU) coxswains, and the Cutter Boat Over-the-Horizon (CB-OTH) section, which teaches counter-narcotic operations to the cutter fleet.

See also

 Deployable Operations Group
 Maritime Law Enforcement Academy
 Maritime Law Enforcement Specialist

Notes
FATS (Firearms Training Simulator)

References

External links
Special Missions Training Center

Uniformed services of the United States
United States Coast Guard schools and training
United States Navy schools and training
United States Marine Corps schools
Deployable Operations Group